A bottle oven or bottle kiln is a type of kiln.  The word 'bottle' refers to the shape of the structure and not to the kiln's products, which are usually pottery, not glass.

Bottle kilns were typical of the industrial landscape of Stoke-on-Trent, where nearly 50 are preserved as listed buildings. They were mostly built in the later 18th and the 19th centuries, although the surviving ones include examples from the 20th century.
Their association with Stoke-on-Trent reflects the fact that the British ceramic industry was mainly based in that city. Bottle kilns are found in other locations in England; for example for Coalport porcelain, and the Fulham Pottery in London. Abroad they can be found at the Monastery of Santa Maria de las Cuevas.

Despite being very inefficient (supposedly 70% of the energy of the fuel was wasted), bottle kilns were constructed until the mid-twentieth century, after which they were replaced by other types of kiln, as the industry ceased to be coal-fired. The Clean Air Act 1956 marked the end of their use in the United Kingdom.

Description

A bottle kiln is protected by an outer hovel which helps to create an updraught. The biscuit kiln was filled with saggars of green flatwares (bedded in flint) by placers. The doors (clammins) were bricked up and then the firing began. Each firing took 14 tons of coal. Fires were lit in the firemouths and baited every four hours. Flames rose up inside the kiln and heat passed between the bungs of saggars. They controlled the temperature of the firing using dampers in the crown. The firing was monitored by Bullers rings placed in the kiln. A kiln would be fired to 1250C.

The biscuitwares were glazed and then fired again in the bigger (but lower temperature) glost kilns; again they were placed in saggars, separated by kiln furniture such as stints, saddles and thimbles.

The enamel kiln (or muffle kiln) is of a different construction, with external flues, and was fired at 700C. The pots were stacked on seven or eight levels of clay bats (shelves). The door is iron lined with brick.

Construction

Around it are iron straps called "bonts". The chamber of the kiln is round with a high domed roof. The floor is also slightly domed, with a central well-hole, while around the walls there are a number of brick bags (chimneys). The kiln was heated from below by a number of coal fires which were stoked from exterior firemouths: the flues from the firemouths pass under the floor to the well-hole and in doing so heated the floor and the kiln. Directly above the firemouths, inside the kiln, are the bags which provided additional chimneys and distributed the direct heat from the flames, up the walls. The height and the diameter of the kiln can vary, and consequently, so did the number of fire mouths. The kiln is entered through a clammin which was designed to be big enough to let in a placer carrying a saggar. The kilns are enclosed in a brick hovel which can be free standing or be part of the workshop.

Saggars

Each pot bank made its own saggars from fire clay. In the saggar maker's workshop, clay would be rolled around a wooded form by the saggar maker, while a lad would knock the bottom using a mawl and an iron mould. A saggar could be expected to last for around 40 firings after which it had to be replaced. During biscuit firing, tableware cups and bowls were put on a fine layer of calcined flint dust on the bottom of the saggar, while flatware was supported like a sandwich between layers of flint. They had to be stacked carefully to prevent distortion during firing. Then the saggar was topped and sealed to prevent any fumes or kiln debris entering the saggar and discolouring the wares. During the second firing, the glost firing, the glazed ware was held by pins, saddles, spurs and thimbles, as any contact point would leave a blemish on the glaze. Sorting the thimbles for reuse was one of the lowest jobs in the potbank.

Operation

Placing and drawing the kiln was the job of placers. Placers would take the unfired greenware that was drying in the greenhouse  (or the glost placing shop) and stack it in the saggar. They would seal the saggar, then carry it into the bottle oven on their heads. They were stacked in bungs in such a way so the most delicate wares were protected. A bung of saggars would be 12 or 13 high, on the top of the bung would be unfired newly moulded green saggars. In the centre of the bottle oven is the well-hole, over it, saggars with no bottoms would be placed in the pipe-bung: this formed a chimney to draw the fires. When the kiln was full, the clammins were bricked up leaving one brick short to form a spyhole so the firemen could watch the buller's rings to judge the temperature of the firing.

The potbank employed a cod placer to supervise the work, but placers who were paid by the job used to wait outside the potbanks for work. Drawing would be done 48 hours after firing finished but in hard times placers were sent into a kiln that was still glowing red after 24. The men wore five layers of clothing and wet cloths over their heads. Life expectancy for a placer was low.

A bottle oven would be fired once a week. The fires were set in each of the firemouths by the firemen. Once alight the kiln would be heated slowly as the moisture was burned out of the clay, this was known as "smoking". Then the kiln would be taken to full temperature, and kept there for three hours then allowed to cool. A biscuit firing took three days and a glost firing took two days. After 48 hours the kiln had cooled sufficiently to be drawn by the placers, and the wares checked. The placers' earnings were dependent on the success of the firing.

Each firing would use 14 tons (13 tonnes) of coal. It was very energy inefficient, and popular sources say that between 50% and 95% of the heat was lost up the chimney. Coal burning is a very dirty process; the smoke from a bottle kiln would eddy around the kiln top, and curl down to ground level either into the yard of the pot bank or into the streets  and houses around.

Preservation
There are 47 standing bottle ovens in Stoke-on-Trent, all are now listed buildings. The largest group is to be found in Longton within its conservation area which protects a number of 19th century pottery works.
 
Bottle ovens open to the public include those of the Gladstone Pottery Museum in Longton, Sharpe's Pottery Museum in Swadlincote, the Middleport Pottery (Burslem, Stoke-on-Trent) and the Coalport China Museum (part of Shropshire's Ironbridge Gorge).

Regeneration
The condition of some of Longton's historic buildings has been deteriorating, and to reverse this a Heritage Action Zone was designated in 2017. These zones aim to breathe "new life into old places", and this particular one, the Stoke-on-Trent Ceramic Heritage Action Zone is intended to have a double function of regenerating Longton and surviving bottle ovens throughout the city of Stoke-on-Trent.

References

External links
Www.bottleoven.blogspot.co.uk

Royal Stafford Guide to making Tableware Modern tableware process.
Potbank Dictionary Archived for the British Library.

Staffordshire pottery
Buildings and structures in Stoke-on-Trent
Structures on the Heritage at Risk register in Staffordshire
Kilns
Firing techniques